Zebra Technologies Corporation is an American mobile computing company specializing in technology used to sense, analyze, and act in real time. The company manufactures and sells marking, tracking, and computer printing technologies. Its products include mobile computers and tablets, software, thermal barcode label and receipt printers, RFID smart label printers/encoders/fixed & handheld readers/antennas, autonomous mobile robots (AMR’s) & machine vision (MV), and fixed industrial scanning hardware & software.

History
Zebra was incorporated in 1969 as Data Specialties Incorporated, a manufacturer of high-speed electromechanical products. The company changed its focus to specialty on-demand labeling and ticketing systems in 1982 and became Zebra Technologies Corporation in 1986. Zebra became a publicly traded company in 1991.

In 1998, Zebra Technologies merged with Eltron International, Inc. In 2000, Comtec Information Systems was acquired by Zebra Technologies, followed in 2003 by the acquisition of Atlantek, Inc., which was a manufacturer of photo ID printers.

In 2004, the company expanded into RFID smart label manufacturing. In the following years, Zebra also acquired Swecoin, WhereNet Corp, Proveo AG, and Navis Holdings (later divested in 2011).

The company bought the Enterprise Solutions Group (ESG) in 2008 and renamed the group Zebra Enterprise Solutions in 2009. In the same year, Multispectral Solutions, Inc. was acquired. In 2012, the companies LaserBand, and StepOne Systems were purchased with a cash price of $1.5 million.

In 2013, the company acquired Hart Systems for $94 million in cash from the private equity firm Topspin Partners LBO.

In 2014, Zebra acquired Motorola Solutions' Enterprise Division in a $3.45 billion transaction, providing mobile computing and advanced data capture communications technologies and services. Zebra's acquisition of the Enterprise Division included the Symbol Technologies and Psion product lines. Also in 2014, Zebra provided its real-time location system (RTLS) in NFL stadiums to track players and officials and provide location-based data for the NFL's Next Gen Stats program.

In 2018, the company acquired Xplore Technologies, a maker of ruggedized tablets and other hard-wearing hardware.

In 2019, Zebra acquired Temptime Corporation, a provider of temperature monitoring devices to the healthcare industry. That same year, Zebra also acquired Profitect, a retail software company that developed a product line used for tracking and identifying inventory losses.

In 2020, Zebra acquired Reflexis Systems, a provider of workforce scheduling and task management software to the retail, food service, hospitality, and banking industries for $575 Million.

In 2021, Zebra acquired Adaptive Vision (provider of graphical MV software), Fetch Robotics (manufacturer of autonomous mobile robots) and Antuit.ai (provider of AI-powered SaaS).

In 2022, Zebra acquired Matrox Imaging, a developer of machine vision components and systems.

Locations

Zebra Technologies has more than 128 offices in 55 countries, including Australia, Brazil, Canada, China, France, Germany, India, Japan, Mexico, Russia, the United Arab Emirates, and the United Kingdom. The company also has over 10,000+ partners across 180 countries. In the 2021 annual report, Zebra stated that it traded in 180 countries, with approximately 128 facilities and 9,800 employees.

References

External links

Electronics companies of the United States
Radio-frequency identification companies
Companies based in Lake County, Illinois
Manufacturing companies based in Illinois
Lincolnshire, Illinois
Electronics companies established in 1969
1969 establishments in Illinois
Companies listed on the Nasdaq
1991 initial public offerings